Izak Cornelis Bergh (born 13 May 1993) is a South African first-class cricketer. He is  right-handed batsman and a right-arm Legbreak bowler. He made his First Class debut for Gauteng against Eastern Province.

References

External links
 

1993 births
Living people
South African cricketers
Gauteng cricketers